La Breille-les-Pins is a commune in the Maine-et-Loire department in western France.

Population

See also
Communes of the Maine-et-Loire department

References

External links

Official site

Communes of Maine-et-Loire